Aksai Chin Lake or Aksayqin Lake, is an endorheic lake in the disputed region of Aksai Chin. The plateau is administered by China but also claimed by India. Its Tibetan/Ladakhi name is Amtogor Lake which means "encounter with a round object".

Geography 

The lake is part of Hotan County, Hotan Prefecture, Xinjiang, The lake is located just south of the Kunlun Mountains. It is fed by the river of the same name, Aksai Chin River.

History 
In the 1950s, prior to the Sino-Indian War, India collected salt from this lake and two other lakes in Aksai Chin to study the economic feasibility of potential salt mining operations. This lake was the only lake deemed economically viable.

See also
 List of locations in Aksai Chin

Notes

References

Aksai Chin
Lakes of Xinjiang
Hotan Prefecture
China–India border